The fruit tree case moth (Coleophora hemerobiella) is a moth of the family Coleophoridae, found in western Europe.

Description
The wingspan is about 14 mm. Adults have whitish forewings speckled with dark grey and usually an obvious blackish spot at around three-quarters. They are on wing in July in western Europe.

The larvae feed on Amelanchier, Chaenomeles, Cotoneaster bacillaris, Cotoneaster integerrimus, Crataegus laevigata, Cydonia oblonga, Malus x astracanica, Malus baccata, Malus domestica, Malus floribunda, Malus fusca, Malus ringo, Malus sylvestris, Mespilus germanica, Prunus avium, Prunus cerasifera, Prunus cerasus, Prunus domestica, Prunus spinosa, Pyrus communis, Sorbus aria, Sorbus aucuparia, Sorbus intermedia, Spiraea x bumalda and x Spiraea vanhouttei. In autumn, the larvae make a composite pistol-shaped leaf case. Early in the following spring, a tubular leaf case is made. This case reaches a length of about 10 mm and is positioned vertically on the leaf with a mouth angle of about 90°. Full-grown cases can be found from the end of May to early June.

Distribution
It is found in western Europe, except Ireland and the Iberian Peninsula.

References

External links

hemerobiella
Moths described in 1763
Moths of Europe
Taxa named by Giovanni Antonio Scopoli